The Cambridge History of Southeast Asia is a 2-volume history book published by Cambridge University Press (CUP) covering the history of Southeast Asia. It was edited by Nicholas Tarling.

Contents
The volumes of the series are as follows:
 From Early Times to c.1800 (edited by Nicholas Tarling), 1992. 
 The Nineteenth and Twentieth Centuries (edited by Nicholas Tarling), 1992.

References

1992 non-fiction books
Cambridge University Press books
History books about Asia
Asian studies
Indonesian studies
History books about Vietnam
History books about Indonesia
History books about Myanmar
History books about Malaysia
History books about the Philippines
History books about Laos
History books about Cambodia
History books about Thailand